Herbert Glacier is located in the Tongass National Forest near Juneau, Alaska in the United States. A six-mile trail, reachable from Glacier Highway, provides walking and bike access closer to the glacier via a former horse trail, and provides information on plant life following glacial recession. As the glacier has receded, mining claims on the Herbert River have increased.

References

Glaciers of Juneau, Alaska
Tongass National Forest
Tourist attractions in Juneau, Alaska